The 1986 SCCA/Escort Endurance Championship season was the second year of the SCCA Endurance Championship. It was the first season of title sponsorship by Escort, replacing title sponsor Playboy Magazine from the previous season.  The class structure was also modified, adding the Super Sports (SS) class and combining the C class of the previous year into the B class.  The per race purse was set to US$28,000 and the year-end points fund grew to $80,000 - to be split among the four classes.

Schedule

Race results

References

External links
World Challenge Official Website

SCCA
GT World Challenge America